Sir Gervais Squire Chittick Rentoul KC (1 August 1884 – 7 March 1946) was a British Conservative politician.

He was the eldest son of Judge James Alexander Rentoul, M.P. for East Down 1890–1902, and his wife, Florence Isabella Young. James Rentoul was something of an eccentric and one contemporary newspaper reported of him that "no man, woman or child wished to see him return to East Down."

He was born in Plumstead and educated at the City of London School, the Royal University of Ireland and Christ Church, Oxford, where he obtained first class honours in Jurisprudence and was President of the Oxford Union Society. 

While at Oxford he was active in the Oxford University Dramatic Society (OUDS). Among the stage roles he played was Angelo in Measure for Measure (1906) and Petruchio in The Taming of the Shrew (1907), a production including the professional actresses Lily Brayton as Katherine (and her real-life sister Agnes as her character's sister, Bianca). After leaving Oxford he acted with the Old Stagers along with fellow barrister and OUDS alumnus C.W.Mercer, who subsequently acted as his best man.

In 1912, he married Christian Muriel Smart (b. 1884); they had one daughter, Sylvia (b. 1916)  who married Ferenc Gallo. In 1924, he was Master of the Guild of Freemen of the City of London.

He was elected Conservative Member of Parliament for Lowestoft in 1922. He was founding chairman of the 1922 Committee (1923–1932) and Parliamentary Private Secretary to the Attorney-General (1925–1929). He became a barrister and took silk in 1930, becoming Recorder of Sandwich. He was knighted in 1929 and retired from Parliament in 1934.

He was portrayed on television by Robin Sachs in the play The Root of all Evil (1981), a dramatisation of the Seddon murder case in 1912 in which Rentoul had appeared for the defence.

Selected publications
Sometimes I Think (Hodder & Stoughton, 1940)
This is My Case An Autobiography (Hutchinson, 1944)

Notes

External links 

1884 births
1946 deaths
Alumni of Christ Church, Oxford
Chairmen of the 1922 Committee
Conservative Party (UK) MPs for English constituencies
English barristers
English King's Counsel
Knights Bachelor
Members of Kensington Metropolitan Borough Council
People educated at the City of London School
Presidents of the Oxford Union
20th-century King's Counsel
UK MPs 1922–1923
UK MPs 1923–1924
UK MPs 1924–1929
UK MPs 1929–1931
UK MPs 1931–1935
20th-century English lawyers
Stipendiary magistrates (England and Wales)